Portrait of Camilla Gonzaga and Her Three Sons is a painting attributed to the Italian Mannerist artist Parmigianino and others, executed around 1539–1540 and housed in the Museo del Prado, Madrid, Spain. It forms a pair with another painting in the Prado, the Portrait of Pier Maria Rossi di San Secondo, Camilla's husband, a painting which is unanimously assigned to Parmigianino.

History
It is mentioned in a 1686 inventory of the collections of the Royal Alcazar of Madrid, as the wife of the count of San Sigundo. The subject has been identified with Camilla Gonzaga, wife  of imperial general Pier Maria III de' Rossi basing on this note, and by another from 1630 by one of his descendants  about the existence of a portrait of him by Parmigianino.

The painting arrived in Spain in 1664, after King Philip IV had  supported to the Rossi family in a dispute with the  Farnese of Parma about some territories.  It has been dated from around   1539–1540, but the attribution to Parmigianino is controversial, the author having been identified also as an artist from Bronzino's workshop. It is possible that Parmigianino, who died in 1540, had not been able to finish the portrait, which was completed by another artist, perhaps basing on his sketch.

Description
The countess is portrayed on a black background, wearing a precious scarlet dress, a frilled mousseline on the chest, and rich  set of jewels. She looks to the right, ideally towards the portrait of her husband. The countess is surrounded by her three sons, Troilo, Federico and Ippolito. It is the first case in Italian art in which this iconography was used.

The three sons appear to be from different hands, and were perhaps added in different moments.

See also
Portrait of Pier Maria Rossi di San Secondo

References

Sources

External links
Page at the museum's website 

Gonzaga
Gonzaga, Camilla
1530s paintings
Paintings of the Museo del Prado by Italian artists
Paintings of children